Deschloroetizolam (also known as Etizolam-2) is a thienotriazolodiazepine that is the dechlorinated analog of the closely related etizolam. The compound has been sold as a designer drug.

Legal status 

Deschloroetizolam is classified and controlled as a hazardous substance in Sweden as of on October 15, 2015.

See also 
 Adinazolam
 Clonazolam
 Deschloroclotizolam
 Diclazepam
 Etizolam
 Flubromazepam
 Flubromazolam
 Fluetizolam
 Meclonazepam
 Metizolam
 Nifoxipam
 Pyrazolam

References 

Designer drugs
GABAA receptor positive allosteric modulators
Hypnotics
Thienotriazolodiazepines